Stoney Point (Trepanier) Aerodrome, was located  southwest of Stoney Point in the township of Lakeshore Ontario, Canada.

References

Defunct airports in Ontario